In United Nations Security Council resolution 444, adopted on 19 January 1979, after recalling resolutions 425 (1978), 426 (1978), 427 (1978) and 434 (1978), and considering the report from the Secretary-General on the United Nations Interim Force in Lebanon (UNIFIL), the Council expressed its concern at the situation in Southern Lebanon and noted that UNIFIL had been unable to complete tasks at the end of its second mandate.

The Council went on to condemn the lack of cooperation from Lebanon and particularly Israel with UNIFIL regarding the implementation of its mandate. Resolution 444 also commended the Government of Lebanon for its attempts to re-establish authority in Southern Lebanon. This came in the context of the Lebanese Civil War

By extending the mandate of the Force until 19 June 1979, the resolution asked UNIFIL, in conjunction with the Secretary-General, to help restore order and authority in the region, including the full implementation of Resolution 425.

The resolution was adopted by 12 votes to none, while Czechoslovakia and the Soviet Union abstained, and China did not participate.

See also
 1978 South Lebanon conflict
 Blue Line
 List of United Nations Security Council Resolutions 401 to 500 (1976–1982)

References
Text of the Resolution at undocs.org

External links
 

 0444
Lebanese Civil War
Palestinian insurgency in South Lebanon
 0444
1979 in Israel
1979 in Lebanon
 0444
January 1979 events